Eleotris pellegrini is a species of fish in the family Eleotridae endemic to Madagascar where it can be found in mangrove swamps. The specific name honours the French ichthyologist Jacques Pellegrin (1873-1944), who discovered this species in 1933 but thought that it was Eleotris vittata.

References

External links
 Photograph

pellegrini
Freshwater fish of Madagascar
Taxonomy articles created by Polbot
Fish described in 1984